Orbexilum stipulatum, commonly known as largestipule leather-root or Falls-of-the-Ohio scurfpea, was a flowering plant that was endemic to Rock Island in the Falls of the Ohio; an area of rapids and rocky limestone outcrops in Kentucky's portion of the Ohio River. No live individuals have been found since 1881 and it is presumed to be extinct.

Overview
Orbexilum stipulatum is thought to have been associated with large herbivore congregations. Rock Island in the Falls of the Ohio area was the shallowest part of the Ohio River, which historically was heavily used for the migration of American buffalo. The plant's population may have collapsed following the eradication of buffalo. If this factor alone had not extirpated Orbexilum stipulatum already, Rock Island and the associated rapids were flooded in the 1920s by the creation of US Dam 41, which sealed the fate for Orbexilum stipulatum at the Falls of the Ohio.

Although all searches to rediscover Orbexilum stipulatum have thus far been unsuccessful, two other species strongly associated with buffalo that were once thought to be extinct, Trifolium stoloniferum and Solidago shortii, have been rediscovered on old buffalo trails and a mineral lick. Solidago shortii also once had a population on Rock Island. However, Orbexilum stipulatum differs in that in the 20 years it was monitored by botanists, it was never once observed to produce seed. This casts doubt as to its ability to have colonized beyond Rock Island.

References

stipulatum
Flora of Kentucky
Endemic flora of the United States
Extinct flora of North America
Plants described in 1840
Plant extinctions since 1500